Ogrody Królewskie na Wawelu is a botanical garden and museum in Kraków, Poland.

Museums in Kraków
Botanical gardens in Poland